The United Network for Organ Sharing (UNOS) is a non-profit, scientific and educational organization that administers the only Organ Procurement and Transplantation Network (OPTN) in the United States, established by the U.S. Congress in 1984 by Gene A. Pierce, founder of United Network for Organ Sharing. Located in Richmond, Virginia, the organization's headquarters are situated near the intersection of Interstate 95 and Interstate 64 in the Virginia BioTechnology Research Park.

Activities
United Network for Organ Sharing is involved in many aspects of the organ transplant and donation process:

 Managing the national transplant waiting list, matching donors to recipients.
 Maintaining the database that contains all organ transplant data for every transplant event that occurs in the U.S.
 Bringing together members to develop policies that make the best use of the limited supply of organs and give all patients a fair chance at receiving the organ they need, regardless of age, sex, ethnicity, religion, lifestyle, or financial/social status. 
 Monitoring every organ match to ensure organ allocation policies are followed. 
 Providing assistance to patients, family members and friends. 
 Educating transplant professionals about their important role in the donation and transplant processes. 
 Educating the public about the importance of organ donation.

History
United Network for Organ Sharing was awarded the initial Organ Procurement and Transplantation Network contract on September 30, 1986, and it is the only organization to ever manage the Organ Procurement and Transplantation Network.

United Network for Organ Sharing provides the Organ Procurement and Transplantation Network with a functional, effective management system incorporating the Board of Directors, committees and regional membership to operate OPTN elements and activities.

In late December 2013, it was announced that United Network for Organ Sharing had developed new policies and regulations governing the new field of hand and face transplants like it does standard organ transplants, giving more Americans who are disfigured by injury or illness a chance at reconstruction.  In July 2014, government regulations go into effect making hand and face transplants subject to the same oversight by United Network for Organ Sharing as heart or kidney transplants. The rules mean potential transplant recipients will be added to the United Network for Organ Sharing network, for matching of donated hands and face tissue to ensure correct tissue type and compatibility for skin color, size, gender and age. Transplants and their outcomes will be tracked.

In 2020, the Senate Finance Committee launched a bipartisan investigation into UNOS, seeking information into various abuses and patient harms. In 2022, the committee published a bipartisan report concluding that "From the top down, the U.S. transplant network is not working, putting Americans’ lives at risk.". UNOS has also come under intense scrutiny for issues related to outdated and insecure technology, as well as failing to address fatal patient safety risks, anti-patient misinformation, and referring to Black and rural patients as "dumb fucks."

An investigation by the United States Senate Committee on Finance published in August 2022 catalogs over a thousand complaints from the previous decade, including patient deaths and injuries caused by failures to check for disease and match blood type.
At an oversight hearing, Senator Elizabeth Warren pointed out that "UNOS is 15 times more likely to lose or damage an organ in transit as an airline is to lose or damage your luggage." Temperature regulation during transport can also be problematic.

Regions 

United Network for Organ Sharing and Organ Procurement and Transplantation Network operate by grouping states into several different regions throughout the country.

 Connecticut, Maine, Massachusetts, New Hampshire, Rhode Island, and Eastern Vermont
 Delaware, District of Columbia, Maryland, New Jersey, Pennsylvania, West Virginia, and the part of Northern Virginia in the Donation Service Area served by the Washington Regional Transplant Community (DCTC) Organ procurement organization
 Alabama, Arkansas, Florida, Georgia, Louisiana, Mississippi, and Puerto Rico
 Oklahoma and Texas
 Arizona, California, Nevada, New Mexico, and Utah
 Alaska, Hawaii, Idaho, Montana, Oregon, and Washington
 Illinois, Minnesota, North Dakota, South Dakota, and Wisconsin
 Colorado, Iowa, Kansas, Missouri, Nebraska, and Wyoming
 New York and Western Vermont
 Indiana, Michigan, and Ohio
 Kentucky, North Carolina, South Carolina, Tennessee, and most of Virginia

Allocation 
United Network for Organ Sharing uses a set policy to remove as much subjectivity as possible from the process of matching organs with recipients (referred to as a "match run"). There are several factors that are involved, including, but not limited to:

 Age
 Ability of the patient to recover
 ABO (though very young recipients are often considered for ABO-incompatible listing)
 Distance
 Height and weight
 Life support status
 Listing status
 Time on the waiting list

The individual criteria varies from one organ type to another. For example, with heart and lung transplantation, candidate recipients are given one of four status levels (1A - the highest level, 1B, 2, and 7). A matching born (i.e. not in utero) candidate of Status 1A within the donor region, of matching ABO type, and within 500 miles will be given the highest priority, with multiple matches being ranked by time on the waiting list. Each of those criteria will be progressively relaxed until a match is found.

Some good-quality donated organs are wasted despite about 20 people per day dying while on waiting lists. Critics say this is because once a given set of organs are turned down once or twice, other potential recipients begin to worry that there might be something wrong with them, and eventually the organs are destroyed after thousands of refusals. Excessive conservatism may be the result of evaluating transplant surgeons based on success rate, giving them an incentive only to attempt procedures with the highest probability of success, rather than maximizing the number of lives saved. New rules announced by the Department of Health and Human Services in 2020 aimed to better balance waiting lists in different regions caused by demographic differences in the causes of death.

Membership 
United Network for Organ Sharing has five classes of members, with varying levels of rights and obligations.
 Institutional members: Regional organ procurement organizations (such as Gift of Hope), hospitals that perform transplantation, or histocompatibility laboratories that serve the aforementioned hospitals.
 Medical/scientific members: Professional organizations whose membership serve the field of transplantation, such as the American Society of Transplant Surgeons or the American Academy of Pediatrics.
 Public organization members: Organizations that serve to support transplant donors, recipients, and their families, such as National Kidney Foundation or the American Diabetes Association, or hospitals that refer donors but do not themselves perform transplants.
 Business members: Companies that do business with two or more institutional members.
 Individual members: Current or former members of the UNOS Board of Directors; Members or family of transplant candidates, donors, recipients; or other individuals who are or were involved in the field of or regulation of organ donation and transplantation, including employees of institutional members.

Leadership 

UNOS, and by extension, the OPTN elects its presidents to a one-year term. Prior to serving that term, they serve for one year as Vice President. After their term as President, they then serve for one year as Immediate Past President. This allows for a more orderly transition between leadership.

List of UNOS/OPTN Presidents 
 1984-1985: G. Melville Williams, MD, Medical College of Virginia
 1985-1986: Oscar Salvatierra Jr., MD
 1986-1988: John C. McDonald, MD
 1988-1989: H. Keith Johnson, MD
 1989-1990: Robert Corry, MD
 1990-1991: James S. Wolf, MD
 1991-1992: Robert Mendez, MD
 1992-1993: R. Randal Bolinger, MD
 1993-1994: Douglas J. Norman, MD
 1994-1995: Margaret D. Allen, MD
 1995-1996: Bruce A. Lucas, MD
 1996-1997: James Burdick, MD
 1997-1998: Lawrence Hunsicker, MD
 1998-1999: William Pfaff, MD
 1999-2000: William D. Payne, MD
 2000-2001: Patricia Adams, MD
 2001-2002: Jeremiah G. Turcotte, MD, University of Michigan Medical Center
 2002-2003: Clyde F. Barker, MD
 2003-2004: Russell Wiesner, MD, Mayo Clinic
 2004-2005: Robert A. Metzger, MD
 2005-2006: Francis L. Delmonico, MD, FACS, Harvard Medical School
 2006-2007: Sue V. McDiarmid, MD, UCLA Medical Center
 2007-2008: Timothy L. Pruett, MD, University of Minnesota Medical Center
 2008-2009: Robert S. D. Higgins, MD, Johns Hopkins School of Medicine 
 2009-2010: James Wynn, MD, Medical College of Georgia
 2010-2011: Charles Alexander, RN, MSN, MBA, CPTC
 2011-2012: John R. Lake, MD, University of Minnesota Medical Center
 2012-2013: John P. Roberts, MD, University of California San Francisco Medical Center
 2013-2014: Kenneth A. Andreoni, MD, Shands Hospital at University of Florida
 2014-2015: Carl L. Berg, MD, Duke University Hospital
 2015-2016: Betsy Walsh, JD, MPH, Novant Health
 2016-2017: Stuart C. Sweet, MD, Washington University in St. Louis School of Medicine
 2017-2018: Yolanda T. Becker, MD, University of Chicago Medicine
 2018-2019: Sue Dunn, RN, BSN, Donor Alliance
 2019-2020: Maryl R. Johnson, MD, FACC, UW School of Health
 2020-2021: David Mulligan, MD, FACS, Yale School of Medicine
 2021-2022: Matthew Cooper, MD, FACS, MedStar Georgetown University Hospital
 2022-2023: Jerry McCauley, MD, MPH, Thomas Jefferson University Hospital
 2023-2024: Dianne LaPointe Rudow ANP-BC, DNP, FAAN, Mount Sinai Medical Center
 2024-2025: Richard Formica, M.D., Yale New Haven Hospital

References

External links
 Official sites:
 Main UNOS site.
 Main OPTN site, with data reports and policies, operated by UNOS on behalf of the Health Resources and Services Administration.
 Transplant Living, for post-transplant recipients and living donors.
 UNOS Meeting Partners, an event-planning service for transplantation-related organizations, including UNOS itself.
 National Donor Memorial
 United for UNOS, which serves to facilitate UNOS community outreach.
 Scientific Registry of Transplant Recipients, related statistical site also operated for the HRSA.

1984 establishments in the United States
Medical and health organizations based in Virginia
Organizations based in Richmond, Virginia
Organizations established in 1984